Tsuneo is a masculine Japanese given name.

Possible writings
Tsuneo can be written using different combinations of kanji characters. Here are some examples:

常雄, "usual, masculine"
常男, "usual, man"
常夫, "usual, husband"
恒雄, "always, masculine"
恒男, "always, man"
恒夫, "always, husband"
庸雄, "common, masculine"
庸男, "common, man"
庸夫, "common, husband"
毎雄, "every, masculine"
毎男, "every, man"
毎夫, "every, husband"

The name can also be written in hiragana つねお or katakana ツネオ.

Notable people with the name
Tsuneo Ando (安藤 毎夫, born 1956), Japanese aikidoka
, Japanese photographer
, Japanese animator
, Japanese baseball player
, Japanese musician
, Japanese businessman and politician
, Japanese anime director
, Japanese businessman
, Japanese anime director
, Japanese diplomat
, Japanese communist and activist
, Japanese electrical engineer
, Japanese astronomer
, Japanese rower
, Japanese speed skater
, Japanese diver
, Japanese politician
, Japanese jojutsuka
, Japanese mathematician
, Japanese diplomat
, Japanese businessman
, Japanese alpinist

Japanese masculine given names